Becoming You is a documentary television series created by Wall to Wall Media and narrated by Olivia Colman. The series was released on November 13, 2020 on Apple TV+.

Premise 
Becoming You follows 100 children from across the world through their first 2,000 days on Earth.

Episodes

Release 
Becoming You was announced on August 26, 2020, along with the rest of the late-2020 docuseries lineup being released by Apple TV+, including Long Way Up, Tiny World, and Earth At Night In Color. The six-episode series was released on November 13, 2020.

References

External links 

 

2020s American documentary television series
English-language television shows
2020 American television series debuts
Apple TV+ original programming